The St. Johns County Soil and Water Conservation District (SWCD), located in St. Johns County, Florida is a government entity dedicated to encouraging productive use of land, water and air resources in the county. According to a summary taken from Florida Statutes Ch. 582, the Board's powers include conducting surveys, investigations, research and demonstrational projects relating to soil and water conservation (in areas like irrigation, water quality, and soil erosion).

District supervisors 
SWCD supervisors do not receive monetary compensation, and, for the most part, conduct their activities on their own time.  Supervisors are members of a five-person board for the district, to which they can either be elected or appointed.  

The current district supervisors are:
Group 1 - John Sykes
Group 2 - Wayne Smith
Group 3 - Henry C. Warner
Group 4 - Craig Hartwig
Group 5 - Pam Livingston Way

External links 
National Association of Conservation Districts
St. Johns County, Florida's listing of currently elected officials

St. Johns County, Florida
Special districts of Florida